Sfântu Gheorghe means "Saint George" in the Romanian language. It may refer to one of the following places in Romania:

Sfântu Gheorghe, a city in Covasna County
Sfântu Gheorghe, Tulcea, a commune in Tulcea County
Sfântu Gheorghe, Ialomița, a commune in Ialomița County
Sfântu Gheorghe, a village in Iernut town, Mureș County
Sfântu Gheorghe, a village in Băneasa Commune, Giurgiu County
Sfântu Gheorghe, a village in Crevedia Mare Commune, Giurgiu County

and to:
Sfântu Gheorghe branch, a distributary of the Danube river
FC Sfîntul Gheorghe, a football team in Moldova

See also
 Sângeorgiu (disambiguation)